Brian Miles Thacker (born April 25, 1945) is a former United States Army officer and a recipient of the United States military's highest decoration for valor, the Medal of Honor, for his actions in the Vietnam War.

Military career
Thacker joined the United States Army from Salt Lake City, Utah, in June 1969. By March 31, 1971 he was serving as a first lieutenant in Battery A of 1st Battalion, 92nd Field Artillery Regiment. On that day, Thacker's base in Kontum Province, Republic of Vietnam, was attacked by North Vietnamese Army forces. He assisted in the defense of the base and, when evacuation became necessary, he stayed behind to cover the retreat. Trapped behind enemy lines, Thacker was able to evade capture until being rescued by friendly forces eight days later.

Medal of Honor citation
First Lieutenant Thacker's official Medal of Honor citation reads:

See also

List of Medal of Honor recipients for the Vietnam War
New Hampshire Historical Marker No. 266: Pinkerton Academy / Old Academy Building

References

External links

1945 births
Living people
United States Army personnel of the Vietnam War
United States Army Medal of Honor recipients
United States Army officers
Vietnam War recipients of the Medal of Honor